Francis Roach Delano (November 20, 1823 – February 6, 1887) was an American businessman and politician.

Delano was born in New Braintree, Massachusetts and went to the public schools and to college. He moved to Saint Paul, Minnesota in 1856 and was a civil engineer for the Great Northern Railway Company. Delano also served as the first warden of the Minnesota Territorial Prison. He served in the Minnesota House of Representatives in 1875. Delano died in Saint Paul, Minnesota. The city of Delano, Minnesota was named for him.

References

1823 births
1887 deaths
People from New Braintree, Massachusetts
Businesspeople from Saint Paul, Minnesota
Politicians from Saint Paul, Minnesota
American railroaders
Members of the Minnesota House of Representatives